B Street District is a  historic district in Livingston, Montana which was listed on the National Register of Historic Places in 1979.

It included four small (approximately  one-story houses built in 1901.

References

Historic districts on the National Register of Historic Places in Montana
Buildings and structures completed in 1901
National Register of Historic Places in Park County, Montana
1901 establishments in Montana
Houses on the National Register of Historic Places in Montana